Silver Sage is an area/community located in north-east Fort Worth, Texas, in an area around Silver Sage park on Silver Sage drive. The community is actually composed of several separate neighborhoods, but people often refer it as one big neighborhood. Silver Sage is a lower to middle class community populated mostly by African-Americans, Whites, Hispanics, and Asians.

Recreation 
Silver Sage Park provides the community with many outdoor activities, such as soccer, baseball, basketball, and football.
Bluebonnet elementary School Park is also in the area.

Education 
Silver Sage is located within Keller ISD.
Fossil Ridge High School
 Fossil Hill Middle school
 Hillwood Middle School
 Parkwood Hill Intermediate
 Chisholm Trail Intermediate
 Bluebonnet Elementary School
 Heritage Elementary School
 North Riverside Elementary

Neighborhoods in Fort Worth, Texas